The 2016 World Surf League World Championship Tour (WCT) is a professional competitive surfing league run by the World Surf League. Men and women compete in separate tours with events taking place from late February to mid-December, at various surfing locations around the world.
Surfers receive points for their best events. The surfer with the most points at the end of the tour (after discarding their two worst results) is announced the 2016 World Surf League Surfing World Champion.

2016 Championship Tour

2016 Men's Championship Tour Jeep Leaderboard

Points are awarded using the following structure:

 Championship Tour surfers best 9 of 11 results are combined to equal their final point total.
 Tournament  results discarded
Legend

Source:

Women's Championship Tour Jeep Leaderboard 

Points are awarded using the following structure:

 Championship Tour surfers best 8 of 10 results are combined to equal their final point total.
 Tournament  results discarded

Legend

Source:

Qualifying Series

MQS

Legend

Source

WQS

Legend

Source

References

External links

 
World Surf League
World League